The Cortelyou Road station is a local station on the BMT Brighton Line of the New York City Subway, located at Cortelyou Road between Marlborough Road (East 15th Street) and East 16th Street in the neighborhood of Flatbush, Brooklyn. The station is served by the Q train at all times.

History

The station, and the road it is named after, are named for 17th-century tutor and surveyor Jacques Cortelyou, who had a hand in the establishment of New Utrecht.

The original station at this location was opened around 1900 as a two-track street-level side platform station running south from a grade crossing at Avenue C. The station was established to serve the commercial area of Avenue C, a major thoroughfare which boasted the only east–west streetcar line between Church Avenue in Flatbush and Sheepshead Bay. The current station house and below-grade platforms were completed at the end of 1907. At the same time, the station was renamed from Avenue C to Cortelyou Road.

Between 1994 and 1996, the station was completely rebuilt with new turnstiles, waiting areas, stairways, and a new token booth. The platforms were renovated and brighter fluorescent lighting was added. A temporary token booth was constructed during the renovation. During the end of the station project, southbound trains bypassed the station between October 11 and November 17, 1995, and northbound trains did the same between November 18 and December 22, 1995. Between December 22, 1995, and April 1996, southbound trains only stopped at the station for exiting only.

From July to October 28, 2013, the northbound platform was closed as part of a component repair project. From February 21 to June 13, 2014, the southbound platform was closed as part of a $3.2 million component repair project, which included work at the Beverley Road and Parkside Avenue stations.

Station layout

This open-cut station has four tracks and two side platforms, typical for a New York City Subway local station.

The station physically resembles the nearby Beverley Road station as the layout and station house are both the same. There are some differences, however. This station has blue columns while Beverley Road has green, there is a signal house for New York City Transit use on the north end that replicates the station house across the street, and the location of the station house in relation to the platforms, is slightly to the north compared to the same location at Beverley Road. Colors at this station are green and beige.

Exit
The station's sole entrance is through a station house at Cortelyou Road between Marlborough Road and East 16th Street. The station house features artwork called Garden Stops by Patsy Norvell, which has etched images of leaves on the glass windows inside fare control facing the south. The artwork can be seen from both inside the mezzanine and while standing on either platform to the south; this artwork is also visible at the neighboring Beverley Road station.

References

External links 

 
 Station Reporter — Q Train
 MTA's Arts For Transit — Cortelyou Road (BMT Brighton Line)
 The Subway Nut — Cortelyou Road Pictures
 Cortelyou Road entrance from Google Maps Street View
 Platforms from Google Maps Street View

BMT Brighton Line stations
New York City Subway stations in Brooklyn
Railway stations in the United States opened in 1907
1900 establishments in New York City
Flatbush, Brooklyn
1907 establishments in New York City